Liaoyang railway station is a railway station on the Harbin–Dalian section of the Beijing–Harbin High-Speed Railway. It is in Liaoyang, Liaoning province, China.

See also

Chinese Eastern Railway
South Manchuria Railway
South Manchuria Railway Zone

References

Railway stations in Liaoning
Stations on the Shenyang–Dalian Railway
Stations on the Harbin–Dalian High-Speed Railway